André Henriques Nunes Coelho  (born 30 October 1993) is a Portuguese futsal player who plays as a universal for Barcelona for the Portugal national team.

Honours

Club
Benfica
Campeonato Nacional: 2018–19
Taça da Liga: 2017–18, 2018–19, 2019–20
Barcelona
Primera División: 2020-21
Copa del Rey: 2019-20

International
Portugal
UEFA Futsal Championship: 2018, 2022
FIFA Futsal World Cup: 2021
Futsal Finalissima: 2022

Orders
  Commander of the Order of Prince Henry
  Commander of the Order of Merit

References

External links

1993 births
Living people
People from Viseu
Portuguese men's futsal players
S.L. Benfica futsal players
FC Barcelona Futsal players
Sportspeople from Viseu District